Restmore is a historic mansion at 375 Warner Hill Road in Fairfield, Connecticut.  It is an 11-room steel and stucco structure, built in 1911-12 by Ira DeVer Warner, a Bridgeport industrialist who owned the Warner Brothers Corset Company.  Warner purchased  of land, built this house as a summer estate, and ran a dairy farm on the remaining land (most of which has since been sold off).

The property was listed on the National Register of Historic Places on July 1, 2010.

See also
National Register of Historic Places listings in Fairfield County, Connecticut

References

Houses on the National Register of Historic Places in Connecticut
Houses in Fairfield, Connecticut
National Register of Historic Places in Fairfield County, Connecticut